Nymbis is a genus of moths of the family Noctuidae.

Species
Nymbis aequa Draudt, 1940
Nymbis fuscilineata Kaye, 1901
Nymbis iniqua Guenée, 1852 (syn: Nymbis basilinea (Walker, 1869), Nymbis coactilis (Felder and Rogenhofer, 1874), Nymbis optabilis (Walker, 1858), Nymbis textilis (Guenée, 1852))
Nymbis prolixa (Felder and Rogenhofer, 1874)
Nymbis succrassata Dyar, 1921

References
Natural History Museum Lepidoptera genus database

Catocalinae
Moth genera